Neville Tiller (4 August 1937 - 5 May 2021) was a New Zealand former rugby league footballer who represented New Zealand.

Early life
Tiller was born in Sydney. He was educated at Marist Brothers High School, Greymouth.

Playing career
Tiller toured Great Britain and France with the Kiwis in 1961.

References

New Zealand rugby league players
New Zealand national rugby league team players
West Coast rugby league team players
South Island rugby league team players
Marist (West Coast) players
People educated at John Paul II High School, Greymouth
1937 births
2021 deaths